A constitutional referendum was held in Egypt on 14 and 15 January 2014 and with Egyptians abroad voting between 8 and 12 January. The new constitution was approved by 98.1% of voters. Turnout was 38.6%.

Background
President Mohamad Morsi was removed from power during the 2013 Egyptian coup d'état. The timetable established by interim president Adly Mansour envisioned a rapid transition, which initially entailed amending the suspended 2012 constitution.

The process of amending the 2012 constitution began with a committee of 10 legal experts. The draft amendments by the committee of 10 made many notable changes to the text of the 2012 constitution. The committee of 10 completed their work on 20 August 2013.

The second phase of the process included amendments by a committee of 50; those 50 people were announced on 1 September 2013. Amr Moussa was chosen as the chairman of the committee of 50 on 8 September 2013. The draft constitution was given to President Mansour on 3 December 2013.

Campaign

Supporters
The Dignity Party backed the constitution. The Free Egyptians Party supported it. The Socialist Popular Alliance Party as well as the Socialist Party of Egypt also supported the constitution. The Popular Current had said that it supported the constitution. The Nour Party said it would support the constitution. Tamarod started a campaign on 5 December 2013 in support of the constitution. The Egyptian Trade Union Federation called on its supporters to vote for the constitution. The National Salvation Front said that it would call for a yes vote on the constitution. The Egyptian Social Democratic Party voted for the constitution.

Opponents
Khaled Ali, a former presidential candidate, was opposed to the constitution; he stated that it was "inappropriate" for Egypt. The Revolutionary Socialists also expressed their opposition to it. The Road of the Revolution Front announced on 8 January 2014 that it would vote against the constitution. The Freedom and Justice Party and the Islamic Bloc, which had won 65.3% of the vote in Egypt's parliamentary elections in 2011–2012, opposed the new Constitution and the referendum as being the fruits of an illegal military coup.

Boycotts
The Anti-Coup Alliance, which includes the Muslim Brotherhood-linked Freedom and Justice Party, announced on 22 December 2013 that it would boycott the vote. The Strong Egypt Party and the April 6 Youth Movement also indicated that they would boycott the vote. The Strong Egypt Party was initially going to mobilize for a "no" vote, but changed their stance after members of the party were arrested for having posters which supported the "no" campaign.

According to the official results, turnout was 38.9%. Turnout in the constitutional referendum of 2012 had been 32.9%.

Conduct
Tamarod, the European Union and 27,000 observers were expected to monitor the referendum; judges affiliated with the Muslim Brotherhood were excluded from supervising polling stations.

According to Human Rights Watch, 11 people were killed in the clashes on 14 January 2014. However, according to the Health ministry, 8 people died in the first day of voting and two people died in the second day of voting.

In the weeks before the voting there were massive arrests of persons opposing the Constitution or the referendum.

Results
Voter participation was about 38.6 percent according to Egyptian government figures that were challenged by the Muslim Brotherhood, which had called of a boycott because the vote was taking place after a military coup. There were almost 20 million total votes in favor. The vote was held with support for a "yes" vote by the Egyptian government and state media as well as a crackdown on those against it.

For comparison, about 16.7 million voters participated in the vote approving the constitution drafted under Morsi. This represented a turnout of 32.9 percent despite a boycott of the vote by non-Islamist factions. Of those that participated in that election, 63.8 percent voted for the Morsi-backed constitution, or about 10.65 million "yes" votes.

By governorate

Reactions

  - President Vladimir Putin was the first president to congratulate Egyptians on the constitution as he asked the new Egyptian ambassador in Russia to convey the best wishes to the Egyptian leadership saying: "We hope the Egyptian society will overcome current political and socio-economic difficulties and the country will return on the path of stability and growth."
  - Abdullah bin Zayed Al Nahyan congratulated the Egyptian people saying: "The move is major milestone towards the roadmap for the future which will usher sisterly Egypt into the aspired stability and development."
  - Nouri Al-Maliki congratulated the Egyptian people saying that the overwhelming support for the constitution shown in polls reflects the Egyptian people's strong will to reject violence and terrorism and strive for peace, stability and freedom.

See also

 Egyptian Constitution of 2014

References

External links
Egypt's constitution 2013 vs. 2012: A comparison, Al Ahram-English, 9 December 2013
English Translation of Egypt's 2013 Draft Constitution, Atlantic Council, 6 December 2013
The Draft in the media (Opinions)

Constitutional referendum
Egyptian constitutional referendum
Referendums in Egypt
Constitutions of Egypt
Egyptian Crisis (2011–2014)
Constitutional referendums in Egypt
Egyptian constitutional referendum